Justin Anthony Knapp (born November 18, 1982), also known by his online moniker Koavf, is an American Wikipedia user who was the first person to contribute more than one million edits to Wikipedia. , Knapp has made over 2.1 million edits on English Wikipedia. He was ranked No. 1 among the most active Wikipedia contributors of all time from April 18, 2012, to November 1, 2015, when he was surpassed by Steven Pruitt.

Education 
Knapp attended Covenant Christian High School, where he enrolled in 1997. He holds degrees in philosophy and political science from Indiana University – Purdue University Indianapolis.

Career

Wikipedia 

Knapp announced his millionth edit to Wikipedia on April 19, 2012. At the time, he had been submitting on average 385 edits a day since signing up in March 2005; about his performance he said: "Being suddenly and involuntarily unemployed will do that to you." Margaret Ferguson, an associate professor of political science at Indiana University – Purdue University Indianapolis and one of Knapp's professors, said she was not surprised by his dedication to editing Wikipedia.  In 2012, Wikipedia co-founder Jimmy Wales congratulated Knapp for his work and presented him with the site's highest award for his achievement by declaring that April 20 would be Justin Knapp Day. In a 2014 interview with Business Insider, Knapp said that "there is no typical day" with regard to his Wikipedia editing, and that his "go-to edits are small style and typo fixes". He also argued that the declining number of Wikipedia editors is "not necessarily a problem".

His Wikipedia username, Koavf, was chosen as an acronym for "King of all Vext Fans", a reference to a contest Knapp entered for Vext in the 1990s. Knapp was a significant contributor to Wikipedia's bibliography of George Orwell, and he has also made many edits involving the categorization of albums through Wikipedia's category structure. In 2012, the Indianapolis Star reported that Knapp sometimes edited Wikipedia for as many as 16 hours a day.

Activism 
In 2005, at the United Nations Sixtieth General Assembly, Knapp advocated for the Sahrawi people and spoke about the situation in Western Sahara. He has also been involved in community organizing for a Restore the Fourth rally in 2013.

Other 
Knapp has had several jobs, including delivering pizzas for the Indianapolis pizzeria Just Pizza, working at a grocery store, and working at a crisis hotline.

List of publications 
 "The Grant Shapps Affair Is a Testament to Wikipedia's Integrity and Transparency", published by Guardian Media Group for The Guardian online, April 23, 2015
 "Engaging the Public in Ethical Reasoning About Big Data" in Ethical Reasoning in Big Data: An Exploratory Analysis (ed. Jeff Collman and Sorin Adam Matei), published by Springer Publishing, April 2016, pp. 43–52,  and

See also 
 History of Wikipedia
 List of people from Indianapolis
 List of Wikipedia people
 Simon Pulsifer

References

External links 

 
 
 "Seven Years, One Million Edits, Zero Dollars: Wikipedia's Flat Broke Superstar"
 "Justin Knapp Becomes Wikipedia Legend With One Million Edits"
 "Justin Knapp: One man, one million Wikipedia edits"
 "Week in Wiki out: Hoosier is top contributor to online encyclopedia"
 Meet The Guy Who's Made 1.4 Million Wikipedia Edits And Counting

1982 births
21st-century American male writers
21st-century American writers
American Wikimedians
Indiana University–Purdue University Indianapolis alumni
Living people
Wikipedia people
Writers from Indianapolis